Brasserie Julien was a brasserie-style French cuisine restaurant located at 1422 Third Avenue  (between East 80th Street and East 81st Street) on the Upper East Side of Manhattan in New York City, as well as a jazz club. The establishment closed at the end of 2012.

Restaurant
The restaurant was named after the son of co-owners Cecilia Pineda Feret and Chef Philippe Feret, who was an executive chef of Windows on the World restaurant, located in New York City, and a pastry chef at Taillevent restaurant, located in Paris, France.  

The art-deco wooden decor was handmade by Chef Feret, including a replica of the elevator door of New York City's Chrysler Building.

The 2013 edition of Zagats gave it a food rating of 18 based on 2012 data. The establishment closed in November 2012.

Jazz club
It was one of the few venues offering no-cover live music in the neighborhood, with resident jazz musician Sedric Choukroun, and notable vocalists including gospel-music artist Ayana Love and French chanteuse Floanne.

See also

 List of jazz clubs
 List of restaurants

References

External links 
 Official website
 "Brasserie Julien" at ChefDB.com

1999 establishments in New York City
Drinking establishments in Manhattan
Music venues completed in 1999
French-American culture in New York City
French restaurants in New York City
Jazz clubs in New York City
Music venues in Manhattan
Nightclubs in Manhattan
Restaurants established in 1999
Restaurants in Manhattan
Upper East Side
Defunct French restaurants in the United States